KhuduKhel or Khudu Khel is a tehsil and Totalai is the Capital of Tehsil Khudu Khel. Totalai is located near district Swabi in the northwestern region of the country. Totalai has a police station named Saheed Noor Wali Khan Police Station (which is named after Noor Wali Khan, who was killed by Taliban in 2008), hospital (THQ), private hospital named (Gohar Hospital & Trust Totalai Khudukhel) the Founder of this Hospital is Surgeon Dr Gohar Ali khan Yousafzai s/o Siraj Muhammad Nishtar Budlakhel established in 6th January 2012 and inaugurated
01 January 2017, degree college for men, degree college for girls and many primary, middle, high, and secondary schools for boys and girls, Office of the Magistrate.
Totalai is an administrative unit of Tehsil Khudu Khel, known as Union council of Buner District in the Khyber Pakhtunkhwa province of Pakistan.

Totalai is the Capital of Tehsil Khudu Khel and also one of the most important towns  of district Buner. This is the gateway to Swat District and Buner previously known as princely state, the Yusafzai State of Swat via Swabi. Totalai is the advanced town of District Buner.

District Buner has 6 Tehsils; Daggar Chagharzai Chamla Khudu Khel Gagra and Gadezai. Each Tehsil comprises members of the Union councils. There are 5 union councils in KhuduKhel and 27 union councils in whole district Buner.

People of Town Totalai

History
Khadukhel have a very rich history and culture, it is a major centre of Gandhara civilisation. The most famous archaeological site is the Ranigat of the Nogram village surrounded by mountains.

Health
Khudokhel tehsil has one civil hospital (Totalai), one basic heath unit (Bagh), and two dispensaries (Chinglai and ghazi kot).

Colored Bazaars
Tehsil Khadukhel has 3 (three) main bazaars on main Buner road which have different beautiful colors Totalai Bazaar have Green, Ghurghshto Bazaar have Blue and Chinglai Bazaar have Violet color.

See also 

 Buner District

References

External links
United Nations
Hajjinfo.org Uploads
PBS paiman.jsi.com

Buner District
Populated places in Buner District
Union councils of Khyber Pakhtunkhwa
Union Councils of Buner District